Moriguchi Station is the name of two train stations in Japan:

 Moriguchi Station (Nagano) (森口駅)
 Moriguchi Station (Osaka) (守口駅)